IBM cloud computing is a set of cloud computing services for business offered by the information technology company IBM. IBM Cloud includes infrastructure as a service (IaaS),  software as a service (SaaS) and platform as a service (PaaS) offered through public, private and hybrid cloud delivery models, in addition to the components that make up those clouds.

Overview 

IBM offers three hardware platforms for cloud computing. These platforms offer built-in support for virtualization. IBM also offers a virtualization application infrastructure, Websphere, which supports programming models and open standards for virtualization.

The management layer of the IBM cloud framework includes IBM Tivoli middleware. Management tools provide capabilities to regulate images with automated provisioning and de-provisioning, monitor operations and meter usage while tracking costs and allocating billing. The last layer of the framework provides integrated workload tools. Workloads (in the context of cloud computing) are services or instances of code that can be executed to meet specific business needs. IBM also offers tools for cloud based collaboration, development and testing, application development, analytics, business-to-business integration, and security.

History 
IBM cloud computing emerged from the union of its mainframe computing and virtualization technologies. Known as the original virtualization company, IBM's first experiments in virtualization occurred in the 1960s with the development of the virtual machine (VM) on CP-40 and CP-67 operating systems. CP-67, a hypervisor used for software testing and development, enabled memory sharing across VMs while giving each user their own virtual memory space. With the machine partitioned into separate VMs, mainframes could run multiple applications and processes at the same time. IBM began selling VM technology for the mainframe in 1972.

In February 1990, IBM released the RS/6000 (which later became known as IBM Power Systems) based servers. The servers, in combination with the IBM mainframe, were built for complex and mission-critical virtualization. Power systems servers include PowerVM hypervisors with live partition mobility and active memory sharing. Live migration was introduced with POWER6 in May 2007. Next, IBM looked to implement standardization and automation in their technology in order to keep up with the proliferation of data produced by increasingly efficient hardware and data centers. This combination of virtualization, standardization and automation led to the development of IBM cloud computing.

IBM began to develop a strategy for cloud computing in 2007, announcing that it planned to build clouds for enterprise clients and provide services to fill what it regarded as gaps in existing cloud environments. In October 2007, IBM announced a partnership with Google to promote cloud computing in universities. In addition to donating hardware and machines, the two companies also provided a curriculum to teach students about cloud computing.

IBM claimed in April 2011 that 80% of Fortune 500 companies were using IBM cloud, and that their software and services were used by more than 20 million end-user customers, with clients including American Airlines, Aviva, Carfax, Frito-Lay, IndiaFirst Life Insurance Company, and 7-Eleven.

On 4 June 2013, IBM announced its acquisition of SoftLayer, which was used to form the IBM Cloud Services Division.

By March 4, 2014, IBM acquired Cloudant.

IBM Cloud 

The IBM SmartCloud brand includes three primary services: the infrastructure, software, and platform services, each of which is offered through public, private and hybrid cloud delivery models. IBM places these offerings under three umbrellas: the SmartCloud Foundation, SmartCloud Services and SmartCloud Solutions.

The SmartCloud Foundation consists of the infrastructure, hardware, provisioning, management, integration and security that serve as the underpinnings of a private or hybrid cloud. Built using those foundational components, PaaS, IaaS and backup services make up SmartCloud Services. Running on this cloud platform and infrastructure, SmartCloud Solutions consist of a number of collaboration, analytics and marketing SaaS applications.

IBM also builds cloud environments for clients that are not necessarily on the SmartCloud Platform. For example, features of the SmartCloud platform—such as Tivoli management software or IBM Systems Director virtualization—can be integrated separately as part of a non-IBM cloud platform. The SmartCloud platform consists solely of IBM hardware, software, services and practices.

IBM SmartCloud Enterprise and SmartCloud Enterprise+ are designed to compete with products like those of Rackspace and Amazon Web Services. Erich Clementi, vice president of Global Technology Services at IBM, said in 2012 that the goal with SmartCloud Enterprise and SmartCloud Enterprise+ was to provide an Amazon EC2-like experience primarily for test and development purposes and to provide a more robust experience for production workloads.

In 2011, IBM SmartCloud integrated Hadoop-based InfoSphere BigInsights for big data, Green Hat for software testing and Nirvanix for cloud storage. In 2012, the then new CEO Virginia Rometty said the company planned to spend $20 billion on acquisitions by 2015.

Users may build their own private cloud or purchase services hosted on the IBM cloud. Users may also purchase IBM hardware, software and services to build their customized cloud environment.

By 2014, the name SmartCloud was replaced with products that have a prefix of IBM Cloud. A product called IBM Cloud Manager with OpenStack was IBM's integration of OpenStack along with a multitude of value additions that would serve enterprise customers. A product called IBM Cloud Orchestrator would serve the orchestration needs of an enterprise. The aforementioned SmartCloud products have been discontinued.

By 2016, the aforementioned product called IBM Cloud Manager with OpenStack was discontinued, although the services organization may be using other versions of OpenStack for large scale cloud deployments.

Public, private and hybrid cloud models
IBM offers cloud delivery options including solely private cloud, solely public cloud, and variations in between. Private, public and hybrid clouds are not strictly distinct, as IBM allows the option to build a customized cloud out of a combination of public cloud and private cloud elements. Companies that prefer to keep all data and processes behind their own firewall can use private cloud services managed by their own IT staff. A company may also choose pay-as-you-go pricing. Hybrid cloud options allow for some processes to be hosted and managed by IBM, while others are kept on a private cloud or on a VPN or VLAN. IBM also offers planning and consultation throughout the deployment process. IBM offers five cloud provision models:
 Private cloud, owned and operated by the customer
 Private cloud, owned by the customer, but operated by IBM (or another provider)
 Private cloud, owned and operated by IBM (or another provider)
 Virtual private cloud services (based on multi-tenanted support for individual enterprises)
 Public cloud services (based on the provision of functions to individuals)
The majority of cloud users choose a hybrid cloud model, with some workloads being served by internal systems, some from commercial cloud providers and some from public cloud service providers.

On August 25, 2011, IBM announced the release of a new hybrid cloud model orchestrated by IBM WebSphere Cast Iron integration of on- and off-premises resources. Enterprises can use Cast Iron integration to link their public cloud appliances— hosted on environments like Amazon EC2, Google Apps, Salesforce.com, Oracle CRM, SugarCRM and a number of others—to their existing systems or in-house, private cloud environments. Cast Iron Integration aims to reduce the time and effort needed for customized coding, in favor of simple workload provisioning through Tivoli Management Framework.

The IBM public cloud offering, SmartCloud Enterprise, was launched on April 7, 2011. SCE is hosted IaaS with service level agreements (SLA)s, and can be offered in a private, public or hybrid model. The environment is hosted on IBM servers (System p or System x), with a standard set of software images to choose from.

For customers who perceive that the security risk of cloud computing adoption is too high, IBM offers private cloud services. IDEAS International wrote in a white paper, "IBM believes that its clients are currently more comfortable with private clouds than public or hybrid clouds, and that many are ready to deploy fundamental business applications in private clouds." For building strictly private clouds, IBM offers IBM Workload Deployer and Cloudburst as ready-to-deploy, “cloud in a box.” Cloudburst provides blade servers, middleware and virtualization for an enterprise to build its own cloud-ready virtual machines. Workload Deployer connects an enterprise's existing servers to virtualization components and middleware in order to help deploy standardized virtual machines designed by IBM.
For customers who prefer to perform their own integration of private clouds, IBM offers a choice of hardware and software building blocks, along with recommendations and a reference architecture, prior to deployment. Clients may choose from IBM virtualization-enabled servers, middleware and SaaS applications.

Cloud standards 

IBM participates in several cloud standards initiatives within various standards development organizations involved in cloud service models IaaS, PaaS and SaaS, all of which work toward improvements in cloud interoperability and security.

IBM is a member of The Open Group, a council that works for the development of open, vendor-neutral IT standards and certifications. Other members of the group include HP, Oracle, SAP and numerous others. IBM contributed the Cloud Computing Reference Architecture in February 2011 to The Open Group as the basis of an industry-wide cloud architecture. IBM's CCRA is based on real-world input from many cloud implementations across IBM. It is intended to be used as a blueprint/guide for architecting cloud implementations, driven by functional and non-functional requirements of the respective cloud implementation.

Within the IaaS space, IBM is a member of the Cloud Management Work Group (CMWG) within the Distributed Management Task Force (DMTF), which released a draft version of their IaaS APIs, called the Cloud Infrastructure Management Interface (CIMI), on September 14, 2011. The CIMI APIs define a logical model for the management of resources within the Infrastructure as a Service domain. With these APIs, clients can create, manage and connect machines, volumes and networks.

For PaaS and SaaS standards, IBM, Red Hat, Cisco, Citrix, EMC and others contribute to the Topology and Orchestration Specification for Cloud Applications (TOSCA) technical committee within Organization for the Advancement of Structured Information Standards (OASIS), which aims to provide a standardized way of managing the lifecycle of cloud services, for portability of cloud based applications.

IBM participates in a number of cloud security related standards including the DMTF Cloud Auditing Data Federation (CADF) working group, and the OASIS Identity in the Cloud (IDCloud) technical committee. CADF is designed to address the need for a cloud provider to provide specific audit event, log and report information on a per-tenant and application basis. IDCloud aims to addresses the serious security challenges posed by identity management in cloud computing and investigates the need for profiles to achieve interoperability within current standards.

IBM founded the Cloud Standards Customer Council (CSCC) in April 2011, with the Object Management Group (OMG) Kaavo, Rackspace and Software AG, as an end user advocacy group that aimed to accelerate adoption of cloud services and eliminate barriers to security and interoperability associated with the transition to the cloud. In addition to contributing standards requirements to various standards development organizations (SDO), the CSCC also creates guides that companies use on their own path to cloud adoption.

Timeline 
March 2018
Cloudant migrated to IBM Cloud
July 2016
IBM Cloud PowerVC Manager
October 2014
IBM Cloud Manager with OpenStack
IBM Cloud Orchestrator
March 2014
Cloudant acquired
October 2011
IBM SmartCloud Application Services
IBM SmartCloud Foundation
IBM SmartCloud Ecosystem
IBM SmartCloud Enterprise+
August 2011
Launch of hybrid cloud with Cast Iron Cloud Integration
July 2011
IBM opens two cloud data centers in Japan
IBM Smarter Commerce
June 2011
IBM SmartCloud Archive launch
IBM SmartCloud Virtualized Server Recovery
IBM SmartCloud Managed Backup
April 2011
Launch of IBM SmartCloud
Launch of IBM SmartCloud Enterprise
IBM Workload Deployer
IBM joins Cloud Standards Customer Council
November 2010
IBM Federal Community Cloud for government organizations
October 2010
IBM Service Delivery Manager
IBM CloudBurst v2.1 (with POWER7-based hardware)
IBM Blueworks Live
July 2010
Announcement of cloud computing data center in Ehningen, Germany
IBM Smart Business Desktop Cloud
February 2010
IBM opens cloud computing data center in Raleigh, North Carolina
November 2009
IBM Smart Business Development and Test on the IBM Cloud
IBM Smart Analytics Cloud
October 2009
IBM Smart Business Storage Cloud
June 2009
IBM Smart Business Services
IBM Cloudburst (later renamed IBM Workload Deployer)
January 2009
LotusLive collaboration suite

See also 

 AppScale
 Amazon Web Services
 Engine Yard
 ENlight Cloud
 Force.com
 GoGrid
 Google App Engine
 Google Compute Engine
 Heroku
 HP Cloud
 Jelastic
 Microsoft Azure
 Nodejitsu
 OpenShift
 OpenStack
 Oracle Cloud
 Rackspace
 SAP Cloud Platform
 Skytap
 VMware

References

External links 
 

IBM cloud services
Cloud computing providers
Cloud computing
Cloud infrastructure
Cloud platforms
Cloud storage
Computer-related introductions in 2010